Bidadari is a housing estate in the Central Region of Singapore, part of the planning area of Toa Payoh.

Before the development, the area was the site of Bidadari Cemetery, which served Christian, Muslim, Hindu and Sinhalese communities.

Etymology 
The word bidadari means "angel" in Malay, which was in turn derived from the Sanskrit word vidhya dhari, which means a nymph of India's heaven or a houri of paradise. The bidadari are depicted as angels that preside over the union of flowers.

History

19th century: Estates and palace 
During the early 19th century, a 45-acre of estate land in Singapore was first acquired by the British civil engineer Henry Minchin Simons in 1855, and there he had the house built between 1855 and 1861 and would later exchange the estate with William Napier for his Tyersall estate. The estate was subsequently sold to Temenggong Abu Bakar in the mid-1860s. He gave it to his second wife, a Danish woman Zubaidah binti Abdullah who was born Cecilia Catharina Lange, for her residence. Thus the estate and house was known as Bidadari and Istana Bidadari in reference to the beauty of the Temenggong's wife.

Soon after Abu Bakar was proclaimed the Sultan of Johor in 1885, Sultana Zubaidah moved to Johor. The palace itself was rented out to various parties until 1902 and later its demolition in 1915.

1908–1996: Cemetery 
In 1902, plans were made to develop a Christian Cemetery. The Municipal Government acquired the land in 1904 and Bidadari Cemetery was officially opened in 1908. Later on, the Muslim, Hindu and Buddhist burial sections were added. The cemetery continued to accept burials till 1972. In 1996, the government announced that the site of the Bidadari Cemetery had been earmarked for development.

2013–present: Redevelopment into residential estate
In 2013, HDB announced plans for a housing estate at the site of the former Bidadari Cemetery. Residential developments are currently underway. Upper Aljunied Road has been realigned, and three new roads (Bidadari Park Drive, Alkaff Crescent, Woodleigh Link) have been constructed to serve the upcoming estate. Woodleigh MRT station along the North East Line will provide MRT access to residents of Bidadari estate once it is ready.

References

Toa Payoh